James Marvin Sturch (born December 8, 1990) is an American politician. He served as a Republican member for the 63rd district of the Arkansas House of Representatives and also the 19th district of the Arkansas Senate.

Sturch was born in Batesville, Arkansas. He attended the University of Arkansas at Little Rock, where he earned a Bachelor of Arts and a Master of Public Administration. In 2015, he was elected to represent the 63rd district in the Arkansas House of Representatives. Sturch succeeded James McLean. He served until 2019, when he was elected to the Arkansas Senate, succeeding Linda Collins. He ran for re-election in 2022, but he lost in a runoff for the Republican primary election.

References 

1990 births
Living people
People from Batesville, Arkansas
Republican Party members of the Arkansas House of Representatives
Republican Party Arkansas state senators
21st-century American politicians
University of Arkansas at Little Rock alumni